My Happy Ending is a 2023 Israeli-British comedy-drama film directed by Sharon Maymon and Tal Granit and starring Andie MacDowell. It is based on the play Sof Tov by Anat Gov.

Cast
Andie MacDowell as Julia
Miriam Margolyes as Judy
Sally Phillips as Mikey
Rakhee Thakrar as Imaan
Tamsin Greig as Nancy
Tom Cullen
Michelle Greenidge as Nurse Emilia
David Walliams as Joey

Production
Filming wrapped in Wales in November 2021.

Release
In January 2023, it was announced that Roadside Attractions acquired North American distribution rights to the film which was released in the United States on February 24, 2023.

Critical reception

Katie Rife of RogerEbert.com awarded the film one and a half stars and wrote that it "can’t even do a tearjerker right."

Ben Kenigsberg of The New York Times gave the film a negative review and wrote, "But the labored screen adaptation shows regrettably few signs of personal fire, and many signs of a work that has been sapped of the intimacy of live theater."

References

External links